Big Lick is an unincorporated community in Stanly County, North Carolina, United States.

Geography
Big Lick is located at latitude 35.242 and longitude -80.344. The elevation is 561 feet.

History
Early settlers observed deer trails that all went to the same destination. When they investigated, they found that deer licked the ground. It turned out there were several salt licks in the area, but this was the big one and was referred to as "Big Lick". A store became a place to meet, and the community had a post office by 1860. The town, officially named Big Lick, was built on land from Jesse and Elizabeth Morton.

References

Unincorporated communities in Stanly County, North Carolina